The 1971–72 Romanian Hockey League season was the 42nd season of the Romanian Hockey League. Eight teams participated in the league, and Dinamo Bucuresti won the championship.

Final round

5th-8th place

External links
hochei.net

Rom
Romanian Hockey League seasons
Rom